Miłosz Szczepański (born 22 March 1998) is a Polish professional footballer who plays as a midfielder for Ekstraklasa side Warta Poznań, on loan from Lechia Gdańsk.

Honours

Club
Legia Warsaw
Polish Cup: 2017–18

Raków Częstochowa
I liga: 2018–19

References

Polish footballers
1998 births
Living people
Association football midfielders
Legia Warsaw II players
Legia Warsaw players
Raków Częstochowa players
Lechia Gdańsk players
Warta Poznań players
Ekstraklasa players
I liga players
III liga players
Poland youth international footballers
Sportspeople from Nowy Sącz